"Black snake" is a term that can refer to two similar types of fireworks: the Pharaoh's snake and the sugar snake. The "Pharaoh's snake" or "Pharaoh's serpent" is the original version of the black snake experiment. It produces a more impressive snake, but its execution depends upon mercury (II) thiocyanate, which is no longer in common use due to its toxicity. For a "sugar snake", sodium bicarbonate and sugar are the commonly used chemicals. 

Once lit, both fireworks emit smoke and spew out ash resembling a snake via an intumescent reaction. They remain on the ground and emit no sparks, flares, projectiles, or sound.

Pharaoh's snake  

The Pharaoh's snake is a more dramatic experiment, yet it requires more safety precautions than the sugar snake due to the presence of toxic mercury vapor and other mercury compounds.

This reaction was discovered by Friedrich Wöhler in 1821, soon after the first synthesis of mercury thiocyanate. It was described as "winding out from itself at the same time worm-like processes, to many times its former bulk, of a very light material of the color of graphite." For some time, a firework product called "Pharaoschlangen" was available to the public in Germany but was eventually banned when the toxic properties of the product were discovered through the deaths of several children who had mistakenly consumed the resulting solid.

The Pharaoh's snake experiment is conducted in the same manner as the sugar snake experiment, however, the former uses mercury(II) thiocyanate (Hg(SCN)2) instead of powdered sugar with baking soda. This must be done in a fume hood because all mercury compounds are hazardous.

After igniting the reagents, mercury(II) thiocyanate breaks down to form mercury(II) sulfide (HgS), carbon disulfide (CS2), and carbon nitride (C3N4). Graphitic carbon nitride, a pale yellow solid, is the main component of the ash.

2 Hg(SCN)2(s) → 2 HgS(s) + CS2(l) + C3N4(s)

Carbon disulfide ignites into carbon dioxide (CO2) and sulfur(IV) oxide (SO2).

CS2(l) + 3 O2(g) → CO2(g) + 2 SO2(g)

While carbon nitride (C3N4) will break down into nitrogen gas and dicyan

2 C3N4(s) → 3 (CN)2(g) + N2(g)

When mercury(II) sulfide (HgS) reacts with oxygen (O2), it will form gray mercury vapor and sulfur dioxide.  If the reaction is performed inside a container, a gray film of mercury coating on its inner surface can be observed.

HgS(s) + O2(g) → Hg(l) + SO2(g)

Sugar snake 

Unlike the carbon snake, which involves the reaction of sulfuric acid instead of sodium bicarbonate, the sugar snake grows relatively faster and to a significantly larger volume.

Solid fuel is used in this experiment. The solid fuel can be sand that is sufficiently covered in ethanol or hexamethylenetetramine.

Three chemical reactions occur when the snake is lit. Sodium bicarbonate breaks down into sodium carbonate, water vapor, and carbon dioxide:

 2 NaHCO3(s) → Na2CO3(s) + H2O(g) + CO2(g)

Burning sucrose or ethanol (reaction with oxygen in the air) produces carbon dioxide gas and water vapor:

 C12H22O11(s) + 12 O2(g) → 12 CO2(g) + 11 H2O(g)
 C2H5OH(l) + 3 O2(g) → 2 CO2(g) + 3 H2O(g)

Some of the sucrose does not burn, but merely decomposes at the high temperature, giving off elemental carbon and water vapor:

 C12H22O11(s) → 12 C(s) + 11 H2O(g)

The carbon in the reaction makes the snake black. The overall process is exothermic enough that the water produced in the reactions is vaporized. This steam, in addition to the carbon dioxide product, makes the snake lightweight and airy and allows it to grow to a large size from a comparably small amount of starting material.

Use 

It is a popular firecracker item in India, which children play with during the festival of Diwali. Though deemed toxic by the Chest Research foundation and Pune University, black snake fireworks are still in use. The objective of the study was to determine which firework produced the most air pollution in India. The conducted study showed that the snake fireworks emitted the highest particulate matter, capable of penetrating the lungs via inhalation of smoke particles and consequently, causing significant damage. Other firecrackers that emit huge amounts of smoke particles include fuljhadi, pulpul, chakris and annar.

See also 

 Chemical volcano
 Soda geyser
 Elephant's toothpaste
 Intumescent
 Starlite

References 

Articles containing video clips
Types of fireworks
Chemistry classroom experiments